Vancomycin-resistant Staphylococcus aureus (VRSA) are strains of Staphylococcus aureus that have become resistant to the glycopeptide antibiotic vancomycin.

Mechanism of acquired resistance
Strains of hVISA and vancomycin-intermediate Staphylococcus aureus (VISA) do not have resistant genes found in Enterococcus and the proposed mechanisms of resistance include the sequential mutations resulting in a thicker cell wall and the synthesis of excess amounts of D-ala-D-ala residues. VRSA strain acquired the vancomycin resistance gene cluster vanA from VRE.

Diagnosis
The diagnosis of vancomycin-resistant Staphylococcus aureus can be done with disk diffusion(and VA screen plate)

Treatment of infection

For isolates with a vancomycin minimum inhibitory concentration (MIC) , an alternative to vancomycin should be used. The approach is to treat with at least one agent to which VISA/VRSA is known to be susceptible by in vitro testing. The agents that are used include daptomycin, linezolid, telavancin, ceftaroline, quinupristin–dalfopristin. For people with methicillin-resistant Staphylococcus aureus (MRSA) bacteremia in the setting of vancomycin failure the IDSA recommends high-dose daptomycin, if the isolate is susceptible, in combination with another agent (e.g. gentamicin, rifampin, linezolid, TMP-SMX, or a beta-lactam antibiotic).

History
Three classes of vancomycin-resistant S. aureus have emerged that differ in vancomycin susceptibilities: vancomycin-intermediate S. aureus (VISA), heterogeneous vancomycin-intermediate S. aureus (hVISA), and high-level vancomycin-resistant S. aureus (VRSA).

Vancomycin-intermediate S. aureus (VISA)
Vancomycin-intermediate S. aureus (VISA) ( or ) was first identified in Japan in 1996 and has since been found in hospitals elsewhere in Asia, as well as in the United Kingdom, France, the U.S., and Brazil. It is also termed GISA (glycopeptide-intermediate Staphylococcus aureus), indicating resistance to all glycopeptide antibiotics. These bacterial strains present a thickening of the cell wall, which is believed to reduce the ability of vancomycin to diffuse into the division septum of the cell required for effective vancomycin treatment.

Vancomycin-resistant S. aureus (VRSA)
High-level vancomycin resistance in S. aureus has been rarely reported. In vitro and in vivo experiments reported in 1992 demonstrated that vancomycin resistance genes from Enterococcus faecalis could be transferred by gene transfer to S. aureus, conferring high-level vancomycin resistance to S. aureus. Until 2002 such a genetic transfer was not reported for wild S. aureus strains. In 2002, a VRSA strain ( or ) was isolated from a patient in Michigan. The isolate contained the mecA gene for methicillin resistance. Vancomycin MICs of the VRSA isolate were consistent with the VanA phenotype of Enterococcus species, and the presence of the vanA gene was confirmed by polymerase chain reaction. The DNA sequence of the VRSA vanA gene was identical to that of a vancomycin-resistant strain of Enterococcus faecalis recovered from the same catheter tip. The vanA gene was later found to be encoded within a transposon located on a plasmid carried by the VRSA isolate. This transposon, Tn1546, confers vanA-type vancomycin resistance in enterococci.

Heterogeneous vancomycin-intermediate S. aureus (hVISA)
The definition of hVISA according to Hiramatsu et al. is a strain of Staphylococcus aureus that gives resistance to vancomycin at a frequency of 10−6 colonies or even higher.

See also
 Drug resistance

References

Further reading

External links 
 PubMed

Staphylococcaceae
Bacterial diseases
Antibiotic-resistant bacteria
Staphylococcus